The Chouteau Bridge a four-lane girder bridge on Route 269 across the Missouri River between Jackson County, Missouri, and Clay County, Missouri. The bridge is named for Francois Chouteau, who was a member of the Chouteau fur trapping family and is considered the first permanent settler in Kansas City.

There have been two bridges that have carried the name Chouteau Bridge. The first bridge was a three-span Whipple truss bridge, built in 1887, and was the second bridge over the Missouri River in the Kansas City, Missouri, area. In the beginning it was a railroad bridge built and used by The Chicago, Milwaukee, St. Paul and Pacific Railroad, or also known as the Milwaukee Road. Upon the completion and opening of the Harry S. Truman Bridge downstream, the Chouteau was converted to vehicular use in 1951. The bridge was very narrow, and in the latter years was often closed because of accidents, and due to low weight issues, when it was reduced to 3 tons, it was closed permanently, and removed by implosion in 2001. It was the oldest bridge on the river when it was demolished. In 2001, a new span was built a few yards upstream of the old span. The north end of the bridge is near the entrance for the Harrah's Casino.

See also
List of bridges documented by the Historic American Engineering Record in Missouri
List of crossings of the Missouri River

External links
Bridgehunter profile

Implosionworld profile
Kansas City Public Library history

Bridges in Kansas City, Missouri
Bridges completed in 1887
Bridges completed in 2002
Bridges over the Missouri River
Buildings and structures in Clay County, Missouri
Buildings and structures in Jackson County, Missouri
Historic American Engineering Record in Missouri
Road bridges in Missouri
2002 establishments in Missouri
Girder bridges in the United States